USS Fechteler has been the name of more than one United States Navy ship, and may refer to:

 , a destroyer escort launched in 1943 and sunk in battle in 1944
 , a destroyer launched in 1945 and decommissioned in 1970

United States Navy ship names